The Faure level crossing accident was a truck-train collision near Cape Town, South Africa that caused nineteen deaths. It occurred at approximately 8 a.m. on 13 November 2006 when a Metrorail train collided with a truck that had stalled on an uncontrolled level crossing at Faure near Somerset West. The truck was carrying at least thirty-three workers from a local vineyard and there were nineteen fatalities (eleven men and eight women) and six other injured people among the occupants of the vehicle. Original estimates had the death toll as high as twenty-seven, but this soon fell to twenty and then nineteen. No passengers on board the train were injured but Metrorail reported that several suffered psychological shock. Witnesses reported seeing smoke but no fire.

Investigation
Police investigated a charge of culpable homicide.

References

2006 in South Africa
Level crossing incidents in South Africa
Railway accidents in 2006
2006 road incidents
November 2006 events in South Africa
2006 disasters in South Africa